Beiqu may refer to:

Beiqu, another term for zaju (13th–14th centuries)
North District, Tainan, Taiwan
North District, Hsinchu, Taiwan
North District, Taichung, Taiwan
North District, Hong Kong